The Democratic Party, commonly referred to as The Democrats, was a left-wing pro-independence political party formed in 1946 by Prince Sisowath Youtevong, who had previously been a member of the French Section of the Workers' International. It was the sole dominant party in Cambodia from 1946 until the creation of Sangkum in 1955.

Its slogan was "Peace, Independence, Discipline and Courage" and its electoral symbol an elephant's head and three lotus flowers.

In the colonial-era government
In the first elections to colonial Cambodia's Constituent Assembly, held in September 1946, the Democrats won 50 out of 67 seats, and for several years they remained the most popular party in Cambodia, despite Yuthevong's early death in 1947. The Democrats - in contrast to their rivals, the Liberal Party (Kanak Sereipheap) of Prince Norodom Norindeth and the Progressive Democrats led by Prince Norodom Montana - were in favour of immediate independence based on the model of French democracy; they also maintained that the Thai-sponsored Khmer Issarak resistance were patriots, thereby irritating the French.

The Party was to sweep the 1947 National Assembly elections, assisted by an enthusiastic team of activists (including a young Saloth Sar, later to become known as Pol Pot, and Ieng Sary). Other prominent figures associated with the Democrats in this period were centrist In Tam and leftist Hu Nim, another future Khmer Rouge cadre.

The defection of Yem Sambaur and several other deputies to the Liberals in 1948, and the subsequent assassination of Democrat leader Ieu Koeus in 1950 by a member of Norindeth's entourage, led to a period of fragmentation and division in the party. However, despite the temporary ascendancy of the Liberals, the Democrats continued to attract many members of the Khmer intellectual elite in the period leading up to and immediately following Cambodian independence in 1953, and retained particular support amongst civil servants and the urban educated classes. Son Ngoc Thanh, a former Prime Minister under the Japanese occupation, was also to join the Democrats between 1951 and 1952, when he left for the forests of northern Cambodia to start his own right-leaning independence movement.

Move leftwards and post-independence defeat

During 1954 the Party moved leftwards, under the influence of Paris-educated political radicals led by Keng Vannsak; Prince Norodom Phurissara became its secretary-general. At this stage its stance emphasised the importance of the 1954 Geneva Conference in guaranteeing independence and the undesirability of accepting American aid as a result (a position similar to that of the rival socialist Pracheachon party).

In 1955 King Norodom Sihanouk abdicated and set up his own anti-communist political movement, the Sangkum, in order to participate in the 1955 general elections; some prominent Democrats (such as Penn Nouth) left the party and joined Sihanouk. Keng Vannsak was fired at by government (i.e. Sangkum) agents at a rally on the eve of the poll, and jailed during the voting, while the party's office in Battambang was ransacked. The Democrats eventually gained 12% of the vote, while the Sangkum won 82% and all seats.

In August 1957, the Democratic Party dissolved itself. According to notes left by Prince Sisowath Monireth, this happened after the remaining leaders were called for a "friendly conference" with Sihanouk and were beaten up by Lon Nol's police on departure.

Re-establishment by In Tam

After Lon Nol deposed Sihanouk in the Cambodian coup of 1970, and the subsequent establishment of the Khmer Republic, the Democratic Party was re-established by In Tam who was one of the coup leaders. However, the manipulation of the 1972 parliamentary elections by Nol and his brother Lon Non meant that the Democrats refused to participate. In Tam was later to retire from politics, the Party being led by Chau Sau; during this period it also made overtures to exiled politician Son Sann. The Democrats, however, gained no further political power before the Khmer Republic itself collapsed in 1975, and the Khmer Rouge established Democratic Kampuchea.

In Tam, after a period in which he was once more associated with the royalists under Sihanouk, was to re-establish a Democratic Party subsequent to the 1991 peace settlement in Cambodia. The Party competed in the 1993 elections but failed to win any seats.

General election results

References

 

1946 establishments in Cambodia
1957 disestablishments in Cambodia
Cambodian democracy movements
Defunct political parties in Cambodia
Independence movements
Nationalist parties in Cambodia
Political parties disestablished in 1957
Political parties established in 1946
Socialist parties in Cambodia